The Queen River, part of the King River catchment, is a minor perennial river located in the West Coast region of Tasmania, Australia.

Course and features
The Queen River rises below , sourced by runoff from the West Coast Range and in particular the peaks of Mount Lyell and Mount Owen.

The river valley is low-lying and narrow, and the subsequent fogs are notable in their effect, some created by smelter fumes in earlier years.

In April 1906, a significant flooding occurred in Queenstown and the southern part of the town due to the river overflowing. Subsequent recorded floods include in 1922, 1937 and 1954.

Tailings
For over 80 years the main carrier of Mount Lyell Mining and Railway Company mining residue, and the local sewage. It is estimated that  of tailings were disposed of into the Queen River. This in turn flowed into the lower part of the King River, and then into a delta at the mouth of the river where it met Macquarie Harbour.

Following the Mount Lyell Remediation and Research and Demonstration Program with the construction of tailings dams, and general reduction of waste into this river, the river flow is now rusty in colour rather than silvery grey as it was previously.

The river passes under and adjacent to the revitalised railway now known as the West Coast Wilderness Railway. South of Queenstown on the edge of the river is the early settlement of Lynchford where a gold mine and other mining activity supported a small community in the early days of the railway.

In October 2018, TasDance dancers performed in the river, as part of The Unconformity festival, to create awareness of the effects mining pollution has on river systems.  The performance was entitled "Junjeiri Bullun, Gurul Gaureima" (which translates to "Shallow Water, Deep Stories") and depicted native animals moving through the water while also exploring local indigenous history.

See also

 Rivers of Tasmania

References

Sources

Mount Lyell Mining and Railway Company
West Coast Range
Queenstown, Tasmania
King River (Tasmania)